"A Great Day for Freedom" is a song by Pink Floyd from their 1994 album, The Division Bell.

Writing
The song, originally titled "In Shades of Grey", addresses the great hopes following the fall of the Berlin Wall and the disappointment that followed. David Gilmour stated:
There was a wonderful moment of optimism when the Wall came down – the release of Eastern Europe from the non-democratic side of the socialist system. But what they have now doesn't seem to be much better. Again, I'm fairly pessimistic about it all. I sort of wish and live in hope, but I tend to think that history moves at a much slower pace than we think it does. I feel that real change takes a long, long time.

Despite Gilmour's statements to the contrary, the lyrics have often been read as a reflection on the bitter and estranged partnership Gilmour had with former bandmate Roger Waters, who was the driving force behind the band's album The Wall. By this interpretation, the "Great Day for Freedom" would be the day Waters left the band, giving the other members freedom to determine the band's future direction. Gilmour commented on this reading: "I'm quite happy for people to interpret The Division Bell any way they like. But maybe a note of caution should be sounded because you can read too much into it. 'A Great Day for Freedom', for example, has got nothing to do with Roger or his 'wall'. It just doesn't. What else can I say?"

According to session player Jon Carin the track was a leftover from the sessions for the band's previous album, A Momentary Lapse of Reason.

In 2022, the song was reworked by Gilmour based on the original tapes, adding some new vocals, instruments and backing vocals by Sam Brown, Durga McBroom and Claudia Fontaine taken from the Pulse rehearsals. It was released as the B-side of the "Hey, Hey, Rise Up!" single. Although both Richard Wright and David Gilmour are credited for playing keyboards on this version, this has been disputed by session keyboardist Jon Carin, who has claimed that he played the keyboards, stating about the credit to Wright that it was "incredibly disrespectful to use his name to promote something when he wasn’t even invited to play on it".

Live
The song was performed by the band on selected dates of The Division Bell tour, and is available on the Pulse (1995) live album, but was omitted from the Pulse VHS and DVD. Gilmour performed it at his solo semi-acoustic concerts in 2002 which can be seen on the David Gilmour in Concert (2002) DVD. The song also made just one appearance during Gilmour's 2006 On an Island Tour, at the final show in Gdańsk, Poland; this performance can be found on the live album/DVD Live in Gdańsk (2008).

Personnel

The Division Bell
David Gilmour – guitar, bass, vocals
Nick Mason – drums, tambourine

Additional musicians:

Jon Carin - piano, Prophet-5 synthesizer
Michael Kamen – orchestral arrangement

The Division Bell Tour, 1994

David Gilmour – electric guitar, lead vocals
Richard Wright – synthesizer
Nick Mason – drums

with:

Guy Pratt – bass
Jon Carin – piano, Hammond organ, vocals
Gary Wallis – percussion
Tim Renwick – acoustic guitar
Sam Brown – backing vocals
Claudia Fontaine – backing vocals
Durga McBroom – backing vocals

David Gilmour Live in Gdańsk, 2006

David Gilmour – electric guitar, lead vocals
Richard Wright – synthesizer
Guy Pratt – bass
Steve DiStanislao – drums
Phil Manzanera – acoustic guitar
Jon Carin – keyboards, vocals

with:

Leszek Możdżer – piano
Polish Baltic Philharmonic orchestra, conducted by Zbigniew Preisner

A Great Day for Freedom 2022

David Gilmour – lead vocals and harmony vocals, guitar, bass, piano, Prophet 5 synthesizer, Hammond organ
Nick Mason – drums
Richard Wright – synthesizer
Sam Brown – backing vocals
Claudia Fontaine – backing vocals
Durga McBroom – backing vocals

References

Pink Floyd songs
1994 songs
Songs written by David Gilmour
Songs with lyrics by Polly Samson
Song recordings produced by Bob Ezrin
Songs against racism and xenophobia
Songs about freedom
Rock ballads
Berlin Wall in popular culture
Song recordings produced by David Gilmour